Quanta is an open access scientific journal covering the foundations of quantum mechanics, mathematical physics, and philosophy of science. The first volume, dedicated to the work of Karl Popper on foundations of quantum mechanics, was published on November 15, 2012. The editor-in-chief and publisher is Danko Georgiev (Institute for Advanced Study, Varna, Bulgaria).

Abstracting and indexing
The journal is abstracted and indexed in:
Chemical Abstracts Service
MathSciNet
Scopus
Zentralblatt MATH

References

Physics journals
Open access journals
English-language journals
Publications established in 2012
Online-only journals